Lorelei, in comics, may refer to:

Lorelei (Asgardian), a supporting character appearing mostly in The Mighty Thor and Marvel's Agents of S.H.I.E.L.D.
Lorelei (Mutate), a mutant supervillain
Lorelei Travis, a minor mutant character appearing in the various titles surrounding the X-Men
Mantis (Marvel Comics), who briefly took the name Lorelei as revealed in the Official Handbook of the Marvel Universe: Avengers 2005

See also
Lorelei (disambiguation)